Richard Hill (born 12 February 1986) is an English former middle-distance runner who competed in the 800 metres. He ran for Great Britain, Notts AC and UWIC.

On 10 June 2006, Richard won the A-race of the BMC Grand Prix event at Watford in a time of 1:45.10. This time made Richard British No 1 for 2006. The race itself was notable too, because due to second placed Michael Rimmer and third placed Sam Ellis also running good times, British athletes held the top 3 places in the European 800m rankings (for a short while). This was the first time this had occurred in over 20 years.

Richard competed for GB at the European Championships in Gothenburg in 2006.

Richard has an elder brother, Craig, who competed at county level in cross country helping pave a successful path for Richard in athletics.  Craig also has won the national BCC titles in volleyball and football showing sporting genes run in the family.

Richard, who also had trial spells with Leeds United FC, attributes his success to his PE teacher, parents and older brother.

References

1986 births
Living people
English male middle-distance runners
Place of birth missing (living people)